This is a list of the horse breeds usually considered to have developed in the African continent. Some may have complex or obscure histories, so inclusion here does not necessarily imply that a breed is predominantly or exclusively African.

References 

 
Horse
Horse breeds